Verneuil-sur-Seine (literally Verneuil on Seine) is a commune in the Yvelines department in the Île-de-France in north-central France.

Population

Education
Schools include:

Preschools:
École La Garenne
École du Chemin Vert
École Joseph-Kosma
École Jean-Jaurès
École Françoise-Dolto
École Jacques-Prévert

Elementary schools:
École Jean-Jaurès
École La Garenne
École La Source

Public junior high schools:
 Collège Jean-Zay

Private:
École Notre-Dame les Oiseaux (preschool/nursery through senior high school/sixth form college)
Notre-Dame International High School  is a part of this institution

Twin towns – sister cities

Verneuil-sur-Seine is twinned with:
 Aguilar de la Frontera, Spain
 Beaconsfield, Canada
 Weiterstadt, Germany

See also
Communes of the Yvelines department

References

External links

Official website 
Notre-Dame Les Oiseaux
International Boarding School in Paris Metropolitan Area
Collège Jean-Zay

Communes of Yvelines